Snickers is a chocolate bar made by the American company Mars, Incorporated, consisting of nougat topped with caramel and peanuts that is encased in milk chocolate. The annual global sales of Snickers was over $3 billion .

In the United Kingdom, Snickers was sold under the brand name Marathon until 1990. A Marathon retro edition was sold exclusively at Morrisons for three months in 2020.

History
In 1930,  Mars introduced Snickers, named after the favorite horse of the Mars family.  The Snickers chocolate bar consists of nougat, peanuts, and caramel with a chocolate coating. The bar was marketed under the name "Marathon" in the UK and Ireland until 1990, when Mars decided to align the UK product with the global Snickers name (Mars had marketed and discontinued an unrelated bar named Marathon in the United States during the 1970s which was similar to the UK's Curly Wurly). There are also several other Snickers products such as Snickers mini, dark chocolate, ice cream bars, Snickers with almonds, Snickers with hazelnuts, Snickers with pecans, Snickers peanut butter bars, Snickers protein and Snickers with Extra Caramel, as well as espresso, fiery, and sweet & salty versions.

Ingredients 
The early (1939) ingredients list includes white sugar, sweet milk chocolate, corn syrup, peanuts, milk condensed with sugar, coconut oil, malted milk, whites of eggs and salt. By 2019, the ingredients for the original bar had been refined to milk chocolate (sugar, cocoa butter, chocolate, skim milk, lactose, milkfat, soy lecithin, artificial flavor), peanuts, corn syrup, sugar, palm oil, skim milk, lactose, salt, egg whites, artificial flavor.

Caloric value

Bar weight
In the United States the listed weight in 2018 was 52.7 g.

Products containing Snickers

The pie had featured on his BBC Saturday programme some two years earlier and the chef described it as an occasional treat only.

Advertising

"It's so satisfying"
In 1980, Snickers (and Marathon) ran ads which featured a variety of everyday people discussing why they like Snickers. The ads featured a jingle that said "It's so satisfying" and had the classic hand that would open and close showing a handful of peanuts converting to a Snickers bar. "Packed with peanuts, Snickers really satisfies" was shown in the commercials.

1984 Olympics
Mars paid $5 million to have Snickers and M&M's named the "official snack" of the 1984 Summer Olympics, outraging nutritionists. Sports promotions in international games continued to be a prominent marketing tool for Mars, that would keep Snickers as an international brand while also selling local bars in some markets.

Not Going Anywhere For a While?
Beginning in 1995, Snickers ran ads which featured someone making a self-inflicted mistake, with the voice-over saying "Not going anywhere for a while? Grab a Snickers!" The tag line at the end of each ad proclaimed, "Hungry? Why Wait?"

One such ad had a player for a fictional American football team showing off his new tattoo of the team's logo on his back to his teammates. He then shows it to his head coach who, after complimenting the tattoo, immediately tells him that he's been traded to Miami. The player then goes to have his old team's logo replaced with the new team's logo.

Some of the ads were done in conjunction with the National Football League, with whom Snickers had a sponsorship deal at the time. One ad featured a member of the grounds crew at Arrowhead Stadium painting the field for an upcoming Kansas City Chiefs game in hot, late-summer weather. After finishing one of the end zones, and visibly exhausted, one of the Chiefs players walks up to him and says the field looks great, "but who are the Chefs?", showing that despite all the hard work the painter accidentally omitted the "i" in Chiefs. Another had Marv Levy in the Buffalo Bills locker room lecturing his team that "no one's going anywhere" until the Bills figure out how to actually win a Super Bowl.

Snickers Feast
In 2007, Snickers launched a campaign which featured Henry VIII and a Viking among others who attend the "Snickers Feast". It consisted of various commercials of the gang and their adventures on the feast.

Super Bowl XLI commercial
On February 4, 2007, during Super Bowl XLI, Snickers commercials aired. This resulted in complaints by gay and lesbian groups against the maker of the candy bar, Masterfoods USA of Hackettstown, New Jersey, a division of Mars, Incorporated. The commercial showed a pair of auto mechanics accidentally kissing while sharing a Snickers bar. After quickly pulling away, one mechanic sheepishly says, "I think we just accidentally kissed.", and another mechanic frantically exclaims, "Quick! Do something manly!" and in three of the four versions, they do so mostly in the form of injury, including tearing out chest hair, striking each other with a very large pipe wrench, and drinking motor oil and windshield washer fluid. In the fourth version, however, a third mechanic shows up and asks "Is there room for three in this Love Boat?"

Complaints were lodged against Masterfoods that the ads were homophobic. Human Rights Campaign president Joe Solmonese is quoted as saying, "This type of jeering from professional sports figures at the sight of two men kissing fuels the kind of anti-gay bullying that haunts countless gay and lesbian school children on playgrounds all across the country."

Gay and Lesbian Alliance Against Defamation (GLAAD) president Neil Giuliano said "That Snickers, Mars and the NFL would promote and endorse this kind of prejudice is simply inexcusable." Masterfoods has since pulled the ads and the website.

Mr. T
In 2006, Mr. T starred in a Snickers advertisement in the UK where he rides up in an army tank and shouts abuse at a football player who appears to be faking an injury, threatening to introduce him to his friend Pain. Another advertisement featured Mr. T launching bars at a swimmer who appeared to refuse to get in a swimming pool because of the cold temperature of the water. In 2008, a European Snickers commercial in which Mr. T uses a Jeep-mounted Minigun to fire Snickers bars at a speedwalker for being a "disgrace to the man race" was pulled after complaints from a US pressure group that the advertisement was homophobic. These advertisements usually ended with Mr. T saying "Snickers: Get Some Nuts!"

NASCAR
In NASCAR racing, Snickers (and the rest of the Mars affiliated brands) sponsor Kyle Busch's #18 Toyota for Joe Gibbs Racing. Prior to that the brand served as a primary sponsor for Ricky Rudd's #88 Robert Yates Racing Ford as well as an associate sponsor for the team's #38 car driven first by Elliott Sadler and then by David Gilliland, and an associate sponsor for the MB2 Motorsports #36 Pontiac driven by Derrike Cope, Ernie Irvan, Ken Schrader, and others. In 1990, Bobby Hillin drove for Stavola Brothers Racing in the #8 Snickers Buick, marking the candy's first appearance as a sponsor; it had since been driven by Rick Wilson and Dick Trickle. Mars announced that at the conclusion of the 2022 NASCAR Cup Series season, they will pull their sponsorship from not only Joe Gibbs Racing, but NASCAR entirely.

FIFA World Cup & UEFA Euro Sponsorship
Snickers was the Official Sponsor of the FIFA World Cup from 1990 until 1998 editions and the UEFA European Championship from 1996 until 2000.

You're Not You When You're Hungry
In 2010, a new advertising campaign was launched, usually based around people turning into different people (usually celebrities) as a result of hunger (taking the new campaign's name "You're Not You When You're Hungry" quite literally). The tagline varied depending on the commercial's location or what variety the commercial is showing. The American adverts initially ended with the tagline "Snickers Satisfies". Steve Burns, best known as the first host of the children’s show Blue’s Clues has done the voice of the announcer. BBDO New York said this campaign made Snickers the number one candy bar, up from seventh. In 2020, USA Today'''s Ad Meter named it the best Super Bowl campaign of the past 25 years.

In 2010, Betty White and Abe Vigoda appeared in the first Snickers commercial in this campaign, playing American football. The commercial was ranked by ADBOWL as the best advertisement of the year. This commercial was also briefly spoofed in an episode of SportsNation on ESPN2 with Michelle Beadle playing the role instead of Betty White in 2011. Later that year, Snickers commercials featured singers Aretha Franklin and Liza Minnelli, and comedians Richard Lewis and Roseanne Barr. A 2011 commercial featured actors Joe Pesci and Don Rickles.

In Latin America, the slogan was the same as in the UK version, except that men doing extreme sports turning into the Mexican singer Anahí as a result of hunger. Brazilian versions of the ad featured actresses Betty Faria and Cláudia Raia.

In 2013, Robin Williams and Bobcat Goldthwait appeared in a Snickers football commercial. Russian duo t.A.T.u. appeared in a Japanese Snickers commercial as themselves throwing a tantrum in a baseball game before eating the chocolate reverts them into normal baseball players. In March 2014, a commercial featuring Godzilla was released to promote the 2014 Godzilla film. In the commercial, Godzilla is shown hanging out with humans on the beach, riding dirt bikes, and water skiing; he only begins rampaging once he is hungry. After being fed a Snickers bar, he resumes having fun with the humans.

In February 2015, Snickers' Super Bowl XLIX commercial featured a parody of a scene from an episode of The Brady Bunch entitled "The Subject Was Noses." In the commercial, Carol and Mike try to calm down a very angry Machete (played by Danny Trejo). When the parents give Machete a Snickers bar, he reverts into Marcia before an irate Jan (played by Steve Buscemi) rants upstairs and walks away. In a second commercial set earlier, Marcia (as Machete) angrily brushes her hair while yelling through her door.

In 2016, for Super Bowl 50, another Snickers commercial was made, featuring Willem Dafoe (as Marilyn Monroe) and Eugene Levy, where Willem Dafoe complains about filming the iconic "subway grate" scene in The Seven Year Itch''. After being given a Snickers, he turns into Marilyn and goes ahead with the scene, with Levy operating the fan below, commenting that the scene will not make the movie's final cut, that nobody would want to see it.

In 2018, Brazil World Cup winner Ronaldo is seen celebrating a goal for Argentina. When he notices the confused faces around him, he eats a Snickers and returns to normal.

The UK version of the campaign usually used British celebrities and, up until 2018, retained the slogan from the Mr. T. era. In the initial advertisement, Joan Collins and Stephanie Beacham featured as locker room footballers who had turned into them due to being hungry. In 2014, Rowan Atkinson as Mr. Bean returned on television by appearing on several UK Snickers commercials and cinema spots, in place of a martial arts master who had turned into him as a result of hunger. Later, in 2018, Elton John appeared in a new advertisement where he turns into African American rapper Boogie after he eats a Snickers; the latter had turned into the former due to hunger (the slogan appeared on a turntable in this advertisement).

This campaign was revived in 2022 in the UK under a slightly different form and new slogan "You're Unfiltered When You're Hungry" while using the initial American "Satisfies" slogan.

Confused? Maybe You Just Need A Snickers

In 2020, a new, albeit short-lived, campaign was introduced that focused on people doing things that contradicted what they think they are doing, such as a man crawling along rocky ground when he thought he was climbing a rock face, the new slogan above indicating it to be the result of hunger-induced confusion.

WrestleMania

Snickers has been an official sponsor of WWE's WrestleMania events, including WrestleMania 2000, 22, 32, 33, 34, 35, 36, 37, 38 and 39, while its Cruncher variant sponsored WrestleMania X-Seven, XIX, XX and 21. Since then, Snickers has sponsored superstars such as Enzo Amore and Big Cass with their signature term, SAWFT, which is labelled at the back of the chocolate bar.

Six Flags Fright Fest
Since 2011, Snickers has been the official sponsor of Six Flags' annual Fright Fest event at its theme parks.

Controversy

Welsh Tweet 
In March 2020, the official Snickers Twitter account caused controversy when it posted a tweet comparing the Welsh language and Welsh place names to someone "sitting on a keyboard". The offending tweet was deleted and an apology was posted soon after.

King-Size Phaseout 
A replacement for the king size Snickers bar was launched in the UK in 2004, and designed to conform to the September 2004 Food and Drink Federation (FDF) "Manifesto for Food and Health". Part of the FDF manifesto was seven pledges of action to encourage the food and drink industry to be more health conscious. Reducing portion size, clearer food labels, and reduction of the levels of fat, sugar, and salt were among the FDF pledges. Mars Incorporated pledged to phase out their king-size bars in 2005 and replace them with shareable bars. A Mars spokesman said: "Our king-size bars that come in one portion will be changed so they are shareable or can be consumed on more than one occasion. The name king-size will be phased out."

These were eventually replaced by the 'Duo' - a double bar pack. The packaging has step-by-step picture instructions of how to open a Duo into two bars, in four simple actions. As Mars stated fulfillment of their promise, the Duo format was met with criticism by the National Obesity Forum and National Consumer Council.

Australian recall 
In December 2000, tens of thousands of Snickers and Mars Bars were removed from New South Wales store shelves due to a series of threatening letters which resulted in fears that the chocolate bars had been poisoned. Mars received letters from an unidentified individual indicating that they planned to plant poisoned chocolate bars on store shelves. The last letter sent included a Snickers bar contaminated with a substance which was later identified as rat poison. The letters claimed that there were seven additional chocolate bars which had been tampered with and which were for sale to the public. As a precautionary measure, Mars issued a massive recall. Mars said that there had been no demand for money and complaints directed to an unidentified third party.

Vein removal hoax 
In April 2022, a Twitter user satirically claimed in a viral tweet that Snickers was removing the "dick vein" design from the top of the candy bar, prompting a backlash from unwitting Snickers fans. Due to the volume of response, Snickers clarified in its own viral tweet that the "veins remain".

Snickers products 
The following variants are available in the United States of America.
Snickers Original
Snickers Milk Chocolate
Snickers Almond
Snickers Peanut Butter
Snickers White Chocolate
Snickers Peanut Brownie
Snickers Almond Brownie Dark Chocolate
Snickers Ice Cream
Snickers 100 Calories Chocolate
Snickers Creamy Peanut Butter
Snickers Crunchy Peanut Butter

See also
 Curly Wurly
 Baby Ruth
 Snickers salad
 Snickers pie
 List of chocolate bar brands
 List of candies

References

External links

 Official website

Products introduced in 1930
American confectionery
Candy
Mars confectionery brands
Peanut dishes
Chocolate bars
Brand name confectionery